James Feddeck is an orchestra conductor. He is Principal Conductor in Milan, Italy of Orchestra i Pomeriggi Musicali. 

As a youth, Feddeck learned the piano.  From 2001 to 2006, Feddeck studied oboe, organ, piano, and conducting at the Oberlin Conservatory of Music.  He earned B.Mus. and M.Mus. degrees from Oberlin in 2005 and 2006.  He was the first recipient of the Outstanding Young Alumni Award from Oberlin in 2010.  At the Aspen Music Festival, Feddeck was a conducting fellow from 2006 to 2008, and assistant conductor for the 2009 season. From the Aspen Festival, he received the Robert J. Harth conducting prize and the Aspen Conducting Prize.

From 2009 to 2013, Feddeck was Assistant Conductor of The Cleveland Orchestra.  In 2009, the Solti Foundation U.S. awarded Feddeck a career assistance grant, and in 2013, awarded him its highest honour, the Sir Georg Solti Conducting Award.

In 2020, Feddeck became Principal Conductor of Orchestra i Pomeriggi Musicali in Milan, Italy.

References

External links
 Official website of James Feddeck
 IMG Artists agency page on James Feddeck

 

American male conductors (music)
American oboists
Male oboists
American male organists
Oberlin Conservatory of Music alumni
Living people
American male pianists
21st-century American conductors (music)
21st-century American pianists
21st-century organists
21st-century American male musicians
21st-century American keyboardists
Year of birth missing (living people)
American organists